The South African cricket team toured Australia in November 2016 to play three Test matches. South Africa won the series 2–1, with victories in Perth and Hobart.

In April 2016, Cricket Australia (CA) suggested that the third Test at the Adelaide Oval could be played as a day/night match, but there was some reluctance from the South African cricketers. In June, CA confirmed that the Adelaide Test would be played as a day/night game. Prior to the series, both teams played practice day/night matches.

South Africa played 2 two-day day/night warm-up fixtures at the Adelaide Oval and the Melbourne Cricket Ground in preparation for the day-night Test match.

Following the conclusion of the second Test, footage emerged of South Africa's captain Faf du Plessis apparently shining the ball using a sweet in his mouth. He was charged by the International Cricket Council (ICC) for ball tampering and pled not-guilty. Hashim Amla said that the situation was "ridiculous" and "a joke". It was suggested that a hearing would take place after the conclusion of the third Test, as Cricket South Africa (CSA) had engaged legal representation for du Plessis. However, on 22 November, du Plessis was found guilty of ball tampering, fined his match fee from the Hobart Test, but was allowed to play in the Adelaide Test. After du Plessis was found guilty he said he disagreed with the verdict stating "I felt like I have done nothing wrong". Du Plessis appealed the charge, but that was rejected on 21 December 2016. The initial penalties of losing his match fee and getting three demerit points stood, but he was not punished with a one-match ban.

Squads

Dale Steyn suffered a shoulder injury during the first Test and was ruled out of the rest of the series. Dwaine Pretorius was added to South Africa's squad to replace Steyn. Joe Burns and Callum Ferguson were added to Australia's squad for the second Test, while Shaun Marsh was ruled out with a broken finger. Peter Siddle was ruled out due to a back injury and Jackson Bird was added to Australia's team as cover for him.

For the third Test of the tour, Australia added Matt Renshaw, Peter Handscomb, Nic Maddinson, Chadd Sayers and Matthew Wade to their squad. Joe Burns, Callum Ferguson, Peter Nevill and Joe Mennie were all dropped, while Adam Voges was ruled out with concussion.

Tour matches

Two-day: Cricket Australia XI vs South Africa XI

Two-day: South Australia XI vs South Africa XI

50-overs: Victoria XI vs South Africans

Test series

1st Test

2nd Test

3rd Test

References

External links
 Series home at ESPN Cricinfo

2016 in Australian cricket
2016 in South African cricket
International cricket competitions in 2016–17
South African cricket tours of Australia
2016–17 Australian cricket season